Edith May Pretty (née Dempster; 1 August 1883 – 17 December 1942) was an English landowner on whose land the Sutton Hoo ship burial was discovered after she hired Basil Brown, a local excavator and amateur archeologist, to find out if anything lay beneath the mounds on her property.

Early life
Edith Pretty was born in Elland, Yorkshire, to Elizabeth (née Brunton, died 1919) and Robert Dempster (born 1853). She had an older sister, Elizabeth. The Dempsters were wealthy industrialists who amassed their fortune from the manufacture of equipment related to the gas industry. Robert Dempster's father, also Robert Dempster, had founded Robert Dempster and Sons in 1855 for this purpose.

In 1884 the family moved to Manchester, where her father founded the engineering firm of R. & J. Dempster with his brother, John. Edith and her family travelled extensively abroad, visiting Egypt, Greece, and Austria-Hungary. After finishing her education at Roedean School, Edith spent six months in Paris in 1901. Later that year, the family embarked on a world tour that included visits to the British Raj and the United States.

From 1907 to 1925, Edith's father took a lease on Vale Royal Abbey, a country house near Whitegate, Cheshire, the family seat of Lord Delamere. Edith grew up with an indoor staff of 25 in addition to 18 gardeners. She engaged in public and charitable works that included helping to buy land for a Christian mission.

Later life
During World War I, Edith served as quartermaster at the Red Cross' auxiliary hospital at Winsford, and helped to house Belgian refugees. By 1917 she was working with the French Red Cross at Vitry-le-François, and Le Bourget in France.

After her mother's death in 1919, Edith cared for her father at Vale Royal. When he died in Cape Town during a visit to South Africa in 1925, Edith and her sister inherited an estate valued at more than £500,000 – about £32 million in 2022.

In 1926, Edith married Frank Pretty (1878–1934) of Ipswich, who had first proposed on her 18th birthday, and had corresponded with her during the War. Pretty was the son of William Tertius Pretty (1842–1916), owner of a corset-making and drapery business in Ipswich. Pretty had been a Major in the Suffolk Regiment's 4th (Territorial) Battalion and had been wounded twice during the War. His participation in 1915 in the Battle of Neuve Chapelle was captured in a 1918 painting by the artist Fred Roe. After the War, Pretty continued to serve the Suffolk Regiment, obtaining the rank of lieutenant colonel and commander of the 4th Battalion in 1922, while also working in the family business.

Edith gave up the lease on Vale Royal after her marriage and bought the 213-hectare (526-acre) Sutton Hoo estate, including Sutton Hoo House, along the River Deben, near Woodbridge, Suffolk. She served as a magistrate in Woodbridge, and in 1926 donated the Dempster Challenge Cup to Winsford Urban District Council, her former Red Cross posting. The Cup has been awarded annually for most years since to a plot-holder on Winsford's garden allotments.

In 1930, at the age of 47, Edith gave birth to a son, Robert Dempster Pretty. Frank Pretty died on his 56th birthday in 1934, from stomach cancer diagnosed earlier that year.

Edith became interested in Spiritualism, visiting faith healer William Parish and supporting a spiritualist church in Woodbridge.

Archaeology at Sutton Hoo

Edith had become acquainted with archaeological digs early in her life through her travels. In addition, her friend Florence Sayce's Egyptologist uncle, Archibald Sayce; and her father excavated a Cistercian abbey adjoining their home at Vale Royal.

Around 18 ancient burial mounds lay on the Sutton Hoo estate, about 450 m (500 yards) from the Pretty home (now Tranmer House, then called Sutton Hoo House). At the 1937 Woodbridge Flower Fete, Edith discussed the possibility of an excavation with Vincent B. Redstone, a member of the Suffolk Institute of Archaeology, and Fellow of both the Royal Historical Society and the Society of Antiquaries. Redstone and the curator of the Ipswich Corporation Museum, Guy Maynard, met Edith in July regarding the project, and self-taught Suffolk archaeologist Basil Brown was subsequently invited to excavate the mounds. Promising finds were made, and Brown returned in the summer of 1939 for further work on the project. He soon unearthed the remains of a large burial site, containing what was later identified as a 7th-century Saxon ship, which may have been the last resting-place of King Rædwald of East Anglia. A curator of the British Museum described the discovery as "one of the most important archaeological discoveries of all time".

The excavation was subsequently taken over by a team of professional archaeologists headed by Charles Phillips and included Cecily Margaret Guido and Stuart Piggott. In September 1939, a treasure trove inquest determined that the grave goods unearthed from the ship were Pretty's property to do with as she chose. She subsequently donated the trove to the British Museum. In recognition of this, prime minister Winston Churchill later offered Pretty the honour of a CBE, but she declined.

Death and subsequent ownership

Edith Pretty died on 17 December 1942 in Richmond Hospital at the age of 59 after suffering a stroke, and was buried in All Saints churchyard at Sutton. A portrait of a 56-year-old Edith was painted by the Dutch artist Cor Visser and donated to the National Trust by David Pretty, her grandson. Most of her estate of £400,000 was placed in a trust for her son, Robert, who was subsequently cared for by his aunt, Elizabeth. Robert died of cancer in June 1988 at the age of 57. Sutton Hoo was used by the War Office until 1946, when it was sold. In the late 20th century the house and Sutton Hoo burial site were bequeathed by the Tranmer family to the National Trust, which now manages the site.

Portrayals in media

Pretty was the subject of a play by Karen Forbes performed at Sutton Hoo in 2019, and features in the novel The Dig by John Preston, published in 2007. She is portrayed by Carey Mulligan in the film adaptation of the same name on the Netflix streaming service in 2021.

References

Further reading

 
 
 

1883 births
1942 deaths
People educated at Roedean School, East Sussex
20th-century English landowners
20th-century women landowners
Sutton Hoo
Archaeology of the kingdom of East Anglia
Archaeological sites in Suffolk
National Trust properties in Suffolk
Museums in Suffolk
Ship burials
People from Elland